Martin McGowan (born 11 August 1962) is a Scottish former footballer who played for Dumbarton, Clydebank, Stranraer, Albion Rovers and East Stirling.

References

1962 births
Scottish footballers
Dumbarton F.C. players
Clydebank F.C. (1965) players
East Stirlingshire F.C. players
Albion Rovers F.C. players
Stranraer F.C. players
Scottish Football League players
Living people
Association football fullbacks